Mildred Masterson McNeilly (28 May 1910 – 12 July 1997) was an American author best known for her novel Each Bright River.  

She also wrote for mystery magazines under the pen-names James Dewey and Glenn Kelly.

Critical reception
The New York Review of Books said "...McNeilly writes with the authority of a careful researcher. There is excitement here as the author re-creates the agony of the Whitman Massacre, the adventure of the Gold Rush of '48, the fear and laughter of spirited men ..."

Bibliography
 Each Bright River: A Novel of the Oregon Country (1950)
 Praise at Morning (1947)
 Heaven is Too High
 Lovely Day
 Great is the Glory (1946)

References

1910 births
1997 deaths
American women novelists
20th-century American women writers